"Rosealia" is a song by American alternative rock group Better Than Ezra. It was released in November 1995 as the third single from their debut album, Deluxe.

Content
The song is about a woman in an abusive relationship.

Background and writing
During a concert in Albuquerque on Monday, September 21, 2009, Kevin Griffin explained to the audience that while living for a short time in Santa Fe, New Mexico, he had a job waiting tables at The Pink Adobe restaurant.  The restaurant's owner was a woman named Rosalea Murphy, and he wrote this song as a tribute to her.

Reception
The single peaked at No. 71 on the Billboard Hot 100. Rosealia spent eleven weeks on the Billboard Modern Rock Tracks chart, peaking at No. 24.

Charts

References

1993 songs
1995 singles
Better Than Ezra songs
Songs written by Kevin Griffin
Elektra Records singles